
Gmina Krapkowice is an urban-rural gmina (administrative district) in Krapkowice County, Opole Voivodeship, in south-western Poland.

Villages
Apart from the town of Krapkowice, Gmina Krapkowice contains the villages and settlements of Borek, Dąbrówka Górna, Gwoździce, Jarczowice, Kórnica, Ligota, Nowy Dwór Prudnicki, Pietna, Posiłek, Rogów Opolski, Ściborowice, Steblów, Wesoła, Żużela and Żywocice.

Neighbouring gminas
Gmina Krapkowice is bordered by the gminy of Głogówek, Gogolin, Strzeleczki, Walce and Zdzieszowice.

Twin towns – sister cities

Gmina Krapkowice is twinned with:

 Camas, United States
 Ebersbach-Neugersdorf, Germany
 Hillsboro, United States
 Lipová-lázně, Czech Republic
 Morawica, Poland
 Partizánske, Slovakia
 Rohatyn, Ukraine
 Wissen, Germany
 Zabierzów, Poland

References

Krapkowice
Krapkowice County